This is a list of the top-level leaders for religious groups with at least 50,000 adherents, and that led anytime since January 1, 2001. It should likewise only name leaders listed on other articles and lists.

Buddhism
Cambodian buddhism —
Tep Vong, Great Supreme Patriarch of Cambodia (2006–present)

Engaged Buddhism —
Thích Nhất Hạnh, (1926–2022)

Sōka Gakkai —
Einosuke Akiya, President (1981–2006)
Minoru Harada, President (2006–present)

Thai Buddhism —
Nyanasamvara Suvaddhana, 19th Somdet Phra and Supreme Patriarch (1989–2013)
Ariyavongsagatanana IX, 20th Somdet Phra and Supreme Patriarch (2017–present)

Tibetan Buddhism
Dalai Lama of the Gelug (Yellow Hat school) —
Tenzin Gyatso, 14th Dalai Lama (1940–present)
Mongolia
Jebtsundamba Khutuktu of the Gelug in Mongolia —
Jambalnamdolchoyjijantsan, 9th Jebtsundamba Khutughtu (1991–2012)
Russia
Buddhist Traditional Sangha of Russia —
Damba Ayusheev, 24th Pandito Khambo Lama (1995–present)

Christianity

Catholicism
Roman Catholic Church, (complete list) –
John Paul II, Pope (1978–2005)
Benedict XVI, Pope (2005–2013)
Francis, Pope (2013–present)

Eastern Catholic Churches sui iuris
Ukrainian Greek Catholic Church –
Lubomyr Husar, Major Archbishop (2001–2011)
Sviatoslav Shevchuk, Major Archbishop (2011–present)
Maronite Church –
Nasrallah Boutros Sfeir, Patriarch (1986–2011)
Bechara Boutros al-Rahi, Patriarch (2011–present)
Syro-Malabar Church –
Varkey Vithayathil, Major Archbishop (1999–2011)
George Alencherry, Major Archbishop (2011–present)

Independent Catholic groups

Old Roman Catholic Church in Europe –
Jerome Lloyd, Metropolitan Archbishop (2012–present)

Apostolic Catholic Church (Philippines) –
John Florentine Teruel, Patriarch (1995–2021)
Juan Almario Calampiano, Patriarch (2021–present)

Philippine Independent Church –
Tomás Millamena, Supreme Bishop (1999–2005)
Godofredo J. David, Supreme Bishop (2005–2011)
Ephraim Fajutagana, Supreme Bishop (2011–2017)
Rhee Timbang, Supreme Bishop (2017–present)

Eastern Orthodoxy

Full Communion
Ecumenical Patriarchate of Constantinople (complete list), the first among equals in Eastern Orthodoxy –
Bartholomew I, Ecumenical Patriarch of Constantinople (1991–present)

Greek Orthodox Patriarchate of Alexandria (complete list) –
Peter VII, Patriarch of Alexandria (1997–2004)
Theodore II, Patriarch of Alexandria (2004–present)

Greek Orthodox Patriarchate of Antioch (complete list) –
Ignatius IV (Hazim), Patriarch of Antioch (1979–2012)
John X (Yazigi), Patriarch of Antioch (2012–present)

Greek Orthodox Patriarchate of Jerusalem –
Irenaios I, Greek Orthodox Patriarch of Jerusalem (2001–2005)
Theophilos III, Greek Orthodox Patriarch of Jerusalem (2005–present)

Albanian Orthodox Church –
Anastasios (Yannoulatos), Archbishop of Tirana, Durrës and All Albania (1992–present)

Bulgarian Orthodox Church (complete list) –
Maxim, Patriarch of All Bulgaria and Metropolitan of Sofia (1971–2012)
Neofit, Patriarch of All Bulgaria and Metropolitan of Sofia (2013–present)

Cypriot Orthodox Church (complete list) –
Chrysostomos I, Archbishop of Nea Justiniana and All Cyprus (1977–2006)
Chrysostomos II, Archbishop of Nea Justiniana and All Cyprus (2006–2022)
George III, Archbishop of Nea Justiniana and All Cyprus (2022–present)

Czech and Slovak Orthodox Church –
Nicholas of Presov, Metropolitan of the Czech Lands and Slovakia (2000–2006)
Christopher of Prague, Metropolitan of the Czech Lands and Slovakia (2006–2014)
Rastilav of Presov, Metropolitan of the Czech Lands and Slovakia (2014–present)

Georgian Orthodox Church –
Ilia II, Catholicos-Patriarch of All Georgia (1977–present)

Church of Greece (complete list) –
Christodoulos of Athens, Archbishop of Athens and All Greece (1998–2008)
Ieronymos II, Archbishop of Athens and All Greece (2008–present)

Polish Orthodox Church –
Sawa (Hrycuniak) of Poland, Metropolitan of Warsaw and All Poland (1998–present)

Romanian Orthodox Church –
Teoctist I, Patriarch of All Romania (1986–2007)
Daniel Ciobotea, Patriarch of All Romania (2007–present)

Russian Orthodox Church (complete list) –
Alexy II of Russia, Patriarch of Moscow and All Russia (1990–2008)
Kirill I, acting (2008–2009), Patriarch of Moscow and All Russia (2009–present)

Serbian Orthodox Church (complete list) –
Pavle, Archbishop of Peć, Metropolitan of Belgrade and Karlovci, and Serbian Patriarch (1990–2009)
Irinej, Archbishop of Peć, Metropolitan of Belgrade and Karlovci, and Serbian Patriarch (2010–2020)
Porfirije, Archbishop of Peć, Metropolitan of Belgrade and Karlovci, and Serbian Patriarch (2021–present)

Orthodox Church of Finland – (complete list)
John Rinne, Archbishop of Karelia and All Finland (1987–2001)
Leo Makkonen Archbishop of Karelia and All Finland (2001–present)

Partial Communion

Orthodox Church in America, North America (complete list) –
Theodosius (Lazor), Archbishop of New York, Metropolitan of All America and Canada (1977–1980)
Theodosius (Lazor), Archbishop of Washington, Metropolitan of All America and Canada (1981–2002)
Herman (Swaiko), Archbishop of Washington, Metropolitan of All America and Canada (2002–2005)
Herman (Swaiko), Archbishop of Washington and New York, Metropolitan of All America and Canada (2005–2008)
Jonah (Paffhausen), Archbishop of Washington and New York, Metropolitan of All America and Canada (2008–2009)
Jonah (Paffhausen), Archbishop of Washington, Metropolitan of All America and Canada (2009–2012)
Tikhon, Metropolitan of All America and Canada (2012–present)

Orthodox Church of Ukraine –
Epiphanius I, Metropolitan of Kiev and All Ukraine (2018–present)

Oriental Orthodoxy
Armenian Apostolic Church (complete list) –
Karekin II, Catholicos of All Armenians (1999–present)
Armenian Apostolic Church (complete list) –
Aram I, Catholicos of Cilicia (1995–present)

Coptic Orthodox Church of Alexandria (complete list) –
Shenouda III of Alexandria, Pope and Patriarch (1971–2012)
Theodoros II of Alexandria, Pope and Patriarch (Pope Tawadros II) (2012–present)

Eritrean Orthodox Church –
Abune Phillipos, Patriarch (1999–2001)
Abune Yacob, Patriarch (2002–2003)
Abune Antonios, Patriarch (2004–2007)
Abune Dioskoros, Patriarch (2007–2015)
Abune Qerlos, Patriarch (2021–2022)

Ethiopian Orthodox Church (complete list) –
Abune Paulos, Abuna and Patriarch (1992–2012)
Abune Mathias, Abuna and Patriarch (2013–present)

Syriac Orthodox Church –
Ignatius Zakka I Iwas (1980–2014)
Ignatius Aphrem II Karim (2014–present)

Indian Orthodox Church (complete list) –
Baselios Marthoma Mathews II,  Catholicos of the East and Malankara Metropolitan (1991–2005)
Baselios Mar Thoma Didymos I,  Catholicos of the East and Malankara Metropolitan (2005–2010)
Baselios Mar Thoma Paulose II, Catholicos of the East and Malankara Metropolitan (2010–2021)
Baselios Marthoma Mathews III, Catholicos of the East and Malankara Metropolitan (2021–present)
Malabar Independent Syrian Church –
Joseph Mar Koorilose IX (1986–2001)
Cyril Mar Baselios I (2001–present)

Protestantism
National Association of Evangelicals –
Kevin Mannoia, President (1999–2001)
Leith Anderson, President (2002–2003)
Ted Haggard, President (2003–2006)
Leith Anderson, President (2006–present)

Baptist 
Baptist World Alliance —
General Secretaries
Denton Lotz (1988–2007)
Neville Callam (2008–present)
Presidents
Billy Kim (2000–2005)
David Coffey (2005–2010)
John Upton (2010–present)

Africa
Baptist Convention of Angola –
Mateus Chaves, President
Alexandre Melo Chilanda, General Secretary

Nigerian Baptist Convention –
President
Uche Enyioha, President
General Secretary and CEO
S. T. Ola Akande, General Secretary
S. Ola Fadeji, General Secretary
Solomon Ademola Ishola, General Secretary

Asia
Paku Karen Baptist Association (Burma) –
Letta, Executive Secretary
Kooler, Executive Secretary
Augustus Spurgeon, Executive Secretary
Caleb Paw, Executive Secretary
Paul Htoo, Executive Secretary

Association of Fundamental Baptist Churches in the Philippines –
Arleen D. Fidel, Chairman (2004–present)

India
Ao Baptist Arogo Mungdang –
O. Alem, General Secretary

Convention of Baptist Churches of Northern Circars –
T. Ch. Immanuel, President (2006–present)
M. Ashok Kumar, Secretary (2006–present)

Manipur Baptist Convention –
Vumthang Sitlhou, General Secretary

Tripura Baptist Christian Union –
Rajani Kaipeng, General Secretary

 Eurasia, regional
Euro-Asian Federation of Evangelical Christians-Baptists Unions —
Alexey Smirnov, President (2012–present)

International Union of Churches of Evangelical Christians-Baptists —
Gennadi Kryuchkov, Chairman (1962–2007)
Nikolay Antonyuk, Chairman (2008–present)

 Eurasia, national
Evangelical Baptist Church of Georgia — Malkhaz Songulashvili, Bishop (present)

Russian Union of Evangelical Christians-Baptists —
Peter Konovalchuk, President (1994–2002)
Yuri Sipko, President (2002–2010)
Alexey Smirnov, President (2010–2018)
Peter Mickiewicz, President (2018–present)

Union of Evangelical Christian Baptists of Kazakhstan —
Frans G. Tissen, President (present)

Europe, regional
European Baptist Federation –
Tony Peck, General Secretary

International Baptist Convention –
Jimmy Martin, General Secretary

Europe, national
Baptist Union of Romania –
Paul Negruţ, President (?–2007)
Otniel Bunaciu, President (2007–present)

Convention of the Hungarian Baptist Churches of Romania –
Borzási István, President

United Kingdom
Baptist Union of Great Britain –
Jonathan Edwards, General Secretary

North America
Canada
Baptist General Conference of Canada –
Jamey McDonald, Executive Director

Canadian Baptist Ministries –
Gary Vincent Nelson, General Secretary

Canadian Baptists of Western Canada –
Jan Paasuke, President of the Board

Sovereign Grace Fellowship of Canada –
Roger Fellows, General Coordinator (2001–NA)
Mark Hudson, General Coordinator

United States
Alliance of Baptists –
Brooks Wicker, President

American Baptist Churches USA –
A. Roy Medley, General Secretary

Association of Reformed Baptist Churches of America –
Gordon Taylor, Coordinator (2008–present)

Baptist Bible Fellowship International –
Linzy Slayden, President

Baptist General Conference –
Jerry Sheveland, President

Baptist Joint Committee for Religious Liberty –
J. Brent Walker – Executive Director (1999–2016)
Amanda Tyler - Executive Director (2017–present)

Baptist Missionary Association of America –
John David Smith, Executive Director, (2010–present)

Baptist Peace Fellowship of North America –
Cheryl Dudley, President, (2008–2011)

Conservative Baptist Association of America –
Stephen LeBar, Executive Director (2004–2009)
Stan Rieb, National Network Facilitator, (2009–present)

Cooperative Baptist Fellowship –
Daniel Vestal, Coordinator (1996–present)

Enterprise Association of Regular Baptists –
Eugene Dickerson, Moderator
Roger Ball, President

Full Gospel Baptist Church Fellowship –
Paul S. Morton, International Presiding Bishop (1994–present)

Fundamental Baptist Fellowship International –
John Vaughn, President

General Association of General Baptists –
James Murray, interim Executive Director

General Association of Regular Baptist Churches –
John Greening, National Representative

National Baptist Convention of America, Inc. –
Stephen J. Thurston, President
Samuel C. Tolbert, General Secretary

National Baptist Convention, USA, Inc. –
William J. Shaw, President (1999–2009)
Julius R. Scruggs, President (2009–2014)
Jerry Young, President (2014–present)

North American Baptist Conference –
Rob McCleland, Executive Director

Ohio Valley Christian Baptist Church of God –
Paul Hagen, General Superintendent
Delmar Rogers, General Secretary

Progressive National Baptist Convention –
General Secretary
Walter Parrish III, General Secretary
President
T. DeWitt Smith, Jr., President (?–2010)
Carroll A. Baltimore, President (2010–2014)
James C. Perkins, President (2014–present)

Southern Baptist Convention (complete list) –
James Merritt, President (2000–2002)
Jack Graham, President (2002–2004)
Bobby Welch, President (2004–2006)
Frank S. Page, President (2006–2008)
Johnny M. Hunt, President (2008–2010)
Bryant Wright, President (2010–2011)
Fred Luter, President (2012–2014)
Ronnie Floyd, President (2014–2016)
Steve Gaines,President (2016–2018)
J.D. Greear, President (2018–2021)
Ed Litton, President (2021–present)

United American Free Will Baptist Church –
Henry J. Rodmon, General Bishop

Holiness
Christian and Missionary Alliance (U.S.) –
David Rambo, President (–2005)
Gary Benedict, President (2005–2013)
Church of the Nazarene –
John A. Knight, General Superintendent (1985–2001)
William J. Prince, General Superintendent (1989–2001)
James Diehl, General Superintendent (1993–2009)
Paul Cunningham, General Superintendent (1993–2009)
Jerry D. Porter, General Superintendent (1997–2017)
Jim Bond, General Superintendent (1997–2005)
W. Talmadge Johnson, General Superintendent (2001–2005)
Jesse Middendorf, General Superintendent (2001–2013)
Nina Gunter, General Superintendent (2005–2009)
J. K. Warrick, General Superintendent (2005–2017)
Eugenio Duarte, General Superintendent (2009–present)
David W. Graves, General Superintendent (2009–present)
Stan Toler, General Superintendent (2009–2017)
David Busic, General Superintendent (2013–present)
Carla Sunberg, General Superintendent (2017–present)
Pillar of Fire International –
Robert Barney Dallenbach, General Superintendent (2000–2008)
Joseph Gross, General Superintendent (2008–present)

Salvation Army –
John Gowans, General (1999–2002)
John Larsson, General (2002–2006)
Shaw Clifton, General (2006–2011)
Linda Bond, General (2011–2013)
André Cox, General (2013–2018)
Brian Peddle, General (2018–present)

Lutheranism
International
Confessional Evangelical Lutheran Conference –
Steven P. Petersen, President (2008–2011)
Daniel Koelpin, President (2011–present)

International Lutheran Council –
Chairman
Ralph Mayan, Chairman (2005–2008)
Gerald B. Kieschnick, Chairman (2009–2010)
Hans-Jörg Voigt, Chairman (2010–2012)
Executive Secretary
Samuel H. Nafzger, Executive Secretary (2001 or before –present)

Lutheran World Federation –
Christian Krause (Germany), President (1997–2003)
Mark Hanson (US), President (2003–2010)
Munib Younan (Palestine), President (2010–present)

Europe
Evangelical Lutheran Church of Estonia –
Jaan Kiivit, Jr, Archbishop (1994–2005)
Andres Põder, Archbishop (2005–2014)
Urmas Viilma, Archbishop (2015–present)
Evangelical Lutheran Church of Estonia Church Abroad
Udo Petersoo, Archbishop, (1990–2006)
Andres Taul, Archbishop, (2007–2010)
Thomas Vaga, Acting Bishop (2011–present)

Evangelical Lutheran Church of Finland –
Jukka Paarma, Archbishop of Turku (1998–2010)
Kari Mäkinen, Archbishop of Turku (2010–2018)
Tapio Luoma, Archbishop of Turku (2018–present)

Church of Norway –
Harald V of Norway, King of Norway (1991–present)

Swedish Church –
Karl Gustav Hammar, Lutheran Primate of Sweden (1997–2006)
Anders Wejryd, Lutheran Primate of Sweden (2006–2014)
Antje Jackelén, Lutheran Primate of Sweden (2014–present)
North America
Lutheran Church–Missouri Synod –
Alvin L. Barry, President (1992–2001)
Robert T. Kuhn, President (2001)
Gerald B. Kieschnick, President (2001–2010)
Matthew C. Harrison, President (2010–present)

Evangelical Lutheran Church in America –
H. George Anderson, Presiding Bishop (1995–2001)
Mark Hanson Presiding Bishop (2001–2013)
Elizabeth Eaton Presiding Bishop (2013–present)

Lutheran Congregations in Mission for Christ –
William Sullivan, National Service Coordinator (2002–2010)
Mark Vander Tuig, National Service Coordinator (2010–present)

Wisconsin Evangelical Lutheran Synod –
Karl R. Gurgel, President (1993–2007)
Mark G. Schroeder, President (2007–present)

Evangelical Lutheran Church in Canada –
Telmor Sartison, National Bishop (1993–2001)
Raymond Schultz, National Bishop (2001–2007)
Susan Johnson, National Bishop (2007–present)

Methodism
African Methodist Episcopal Church –
Clement W. Fugh, General Secretary (2000–present)
Chinese Methodist Church in Australia –
Albert Chiew, Bishop (–2010)
James Kwang, Bishop (2010–present)
Free Methodist Church in Canada –
Keith A. Elford, Bishop (1997–2017)
 Cliff Fletcher, Bishop (2017–present)
Iglesia Evangelica Metodista en las Islas Filipinas –
Nathaniel P. Lazaro, General Superintendent (2000–present)
Methodist Church Ghana –
Samuel Asante Antwi, President and Presiding Bishop (1997–2003)
Robert Aboagye-Mensah, Presiding Bishop (2003–2009)
Emmanuel Asante, Presiding Bishop (2009–present)
Methodist Church in Malaysia –
Peter Chio, Bishop (?–2004)
Hwa Yung, Bishop (2004–present)
Methodist Church of Southern Africa –
President
H Mvume Dandala, President (1998–2003)
Ivan M Abrahams, President (2003–present)
General Secretary
Vivian Harris, General Secretary (1988–2001)
Ross A J Olivier, General Secretary (2001–2005)
Vuyani G Nyobole, General Secretary (2005–present)
United Methodist Church –
Gregory V. Palmer, President of the Council of Bishops (2008–2010)
Larry M. Goodpaster, President of the Council of Bishops (2010–2012)
Rosemarie Wenner, President of the Council of Bishops (2012–2014)
Warner Brown, President of the Council of Bishops (2014–present)

Pentecostalism 
World Assemblies of God Fellowship –
Thomas E. Trask, Chairman (2000–2008)
George O. Wood, Chairman (2008–2022)

Assemblies of God, United States –
Thomas E. Trask, General superintendent (1993–2007)
George O. Wood, General superintendent (2007–2017)
Doug E. Clay, General superintendent (2017–present)

Grace Communion International (until 2009, called the Worldwide Church of God from 1968 to 2009) –
Joseph Tkach, Jr., President and pastor general (1995–present)

New Apostolic Church –
Richard Fehr, Chief apostle (1988–2005)
Wilhelm Leber, Chief apostle (2005–2013)
Jean-Luc Schneider (2013–present)

Presbyterianism 

Church of Scotland (complete list) —					
John Miller, Moderator of the General Assembly (2001)
Finlay Macdonald, Moderator of the General Assembly (2002)
Iain Torrance, Moderator of the General Assembly (2003)
Alison Elliot, Moderator of the General Assembly (2004)
David Lacy, Moderator of the General Assembly (2005)
Alan McDonald, Moderator of the General Assembly (2006)
Sheilagh M. Kesting, Moderator of the General Assembly (2007)
David W. Lunan, Moderator of the General Assembly (2008)
William C. Hewitt, Moderator of the General Assembly (2009)
John Christie, Moderator of the General Assembly (2010)
A. David K. Arnott, Moderator of the General Assembly (2011)
Albert O. Bogle, Moderator of the General Assembly (2012)
Lorna Hood, Moderator of the General Assembly (2013)
John Chalmers, Moderator of the General Assembly (2014)
						
Presbyterian Church (U.S.A.) (complete list) —					
Syngman Rhee, Moderator of the General Assembly (2000–2001)
Jack Rogers, Moderator of the General Assembly (2001–2002)
Fahed Abu-Akel, Moderator of the General Assembly (2002–2003)
Susan R. Andrews, Moderator of the General Assembly (2003–2004)
Rick Ufford-Chase, Moderator of the General Assembly (2004–2006)
Joan Gray, Moderator of the General Assembly (2006–2008)
Bruce Reyes-Chow, Moderator of the General Assembly (2008–2010)
Cynthia Bolbach, Moderator of the General Assembly (2010–2012)
Neal Presa, Moderator of the General Assembly (2012–2014)

Other protestant

Christian Church (Disciples of Christ)
General Minister and President
Richard L. Hamm (1993-2003)
William "Chris" Hobgood, interim (2003–2005)
Sharon E. Watkins (2005–2017)
Teresa Hord Owens (2017–Present)
Moderator of the General Assembly
Paul D. Rivera (1999–2001)
Alvin O. Jackson (2001–2003)
Charisse Gillett (2003–2005)
Bill Lee (2005–2007)
Newell Williams (2007–2009)
Larry Brown (2009–2011)
Regina Morton (2011–2013)
Glen Miles (2013–2015)
Tony Rodriguez (2015–2017)
Sue Morris (2017–2019)
Belva Brown Jordan (2019–2023)

Seventh-day Adventists (complete list) –
Jan Paulsen, General Conference President (1999–2010)
Ted N. C. Wilson, General Conference President (2010–present)

General Assembly of Unitarian and Free Christian Churches (UK)
 Liz Slade, Chief Officer (2019–present)

Uniting Church in Australia –
President
James Haire, President (2000–2003)
Dean Drayton, President (2003–2006)
Gregor Henderson, President (2006–2009)
Alistair Macrae, President (2009–2012)
Andrew Dutney, President (2012–2015)
Stuart McMillan, President (2015–2018)
Deidre Palmer, President (2018–2021)
Sharon Hollis, President (2021–present)
General Secretary
Gregor Henderson, General Secretary (1989–2001)
Terence Corkin, General Secretary (2001–2015)
Colleen Geyer, General Secretary (2016–present)

United Church of Canada –
Marion Pardy, Moderator (2000–2003)
Peter Short, Moderator (2003–2006)
David Giuliano, Moderator (2006–2009)
Mardi Tindal, Moderator (2009–2012)
Gary Paterson, Moderator (2012–2015)
Jordan Cantwell, Moderator (2015–2018)
Richard Bott, Moderator (2018–present)

Anglicanism

Provinces of the Anglican Communion
Church of England –
Formal leadership –
Elizabeth II, Supreme Governor of the Church of England (1952–2022)
Charles III, Supreme Governor of the Church of England (2022-present)
Effective leadership, (complete list) –
George Carey, Archbishop of Canterbury (1991–2002)
Rowan Williams, Archbishop of Canterbury (2002–2012)
Justin Welby, Archbishop of Canterbury (2013–present)
Anglican Church of Australia (complete list)–
Peter Carnley, Primate (2000–2005)
Phillip Aspinall, Primate (2005–2014)
Philip Freier, Primate (2014–2020)
Geoffrey Smith, Primate (2020–present)
Anglican Church of Canada –
Michael Peers, Primate (1986–2004)
Fred Hiltz, Primate (2007–2019)
Linda Nicholls, Primate (2019–present)

Episcopal Church in the United States of America –
Frank Griswold, Presiding Bishop (1998–2006)
Katharine Jefferts Schori, Presiding Bishop (2006–2016)
Michael B. Curry, Presiding Bishop (2016–present)
George L.W. Werner, President of the House of Deputies (2000–2006)

Continuing Anglicanism
Anglican Orthodox Church – Jerry L. Ogles, Presiding Bishop (2003–present)

Federation of Anglican Churches in the Americas
Anglican Church in America –
Louis Falk, Primate (1991–2005)
Louis Falk, President of the House of Bishops (2005–present)
Anglican Province of America – Walter Grundorf, Presiding Bishop (early 1990s–present)
Diocese of the Holy Cross – Paul C. Hewett, Diocesan Bishop (2006–present)
Episcopal Missionary Church –
William Millsaps, Presiding Bishop (2000–2005)
Council Nedd II, Presiding Bishop (2005–present)
Reformed Episcopal Church – Leonard W. Riches, Presiding Bishop (1996–present)

Fellowship of Confessing Anglicans – Eliud Wabukala, Chairman (2008–present)
Anglican Church in North America – 
Robert Duncan, Primate (2009–2014)
Foley Beach,Primate (2014–present)
Church of England in South Africa –
Frank J. Retief, Presiding Bishop (2000–2010)
Desmond Inglesby, Presiding Bishop (2010–present)

North American Anglican Conference
Anglican Episcopal Church –
Reginald Hammond, Presiding Bishop (2000–2004)
George Connor, Presiding Bishop (2006–present)
Diocese of the Great Lakes –
Julius A. Neeser, Bishop Ordinary (1998–2002)
David T. Hustwick, Bishop Ordinary (2002–present)
Orthodox Anglican Communion –
Scott Earle McLaughlin, Metropolitan Archbishop (2000–2012)
Creighton Jones, Metropolitan Archbishop (2012–2015)
Thomas Gordon, Metropolitan Archbishop (2015–present)
Orthodox Anglican Church –
Scott Earle McLaughlin, Presiding Bishop (2000–2012)
Creighton Jones, Presiding Bishop (2012–2015)
Thomas Gordon, Presiding Bishop (2015–present)
Traditional Anglican Communion –
Louis Falk, Primate (1991–2002)
John Hepworth, Primate (2002–2012)
Samuel Prakash, Primate (2012–present)
Anglican Catholic Church in Australia – 
John Hepworth, Archbishop (1998–2012)
Michael Pope, Archbishop (2013–present)
Anglican Catholic Church of Canada –
Robert Mercer, Bishop and Metropolitan (1988–2005)
Peter Wilkinson, Bishop and Metropolitan (2005–present)
Anglican Church of India – Stephen Vattappara, Metropolitan Bishop (1990–present)
Anglican Church in America –
Louis Falk, Primate (1991–2005)
Louis Falk, President of the House of Bishops (2005–present)
United Episcopal Church of North America –
Stephen C. Reber, Presiding Bishop (1996–2010)
Peter D. Robinson, Presiding Bishop (2010–present)

Other Christian or Christian-derived faiths
Believers Eastern Church –
Athanasius Yohan  I, Metropolitan (1993–present)

Church of God Ministry of Jesus Christ International
María Luisa Piraquive, World Leader (1996–present)
Assyrian Church of the East – 
Mar Dinkha IV, Patriarch (1976–2015)
Mar Gerwargis III, Patriarch (2015–2021)
Mar Awa III, Patriarch (2021–present)

Ancient Church of the East – 
Mar Addai II, Patriarch (1972–2022)
Yacob III Daniel, Patriarch (2022-present)
Malankara Marthoma Syrian Church –
Philipose Mar Chrysostym Mar Thoma, Marthoma Metropolitan (1999–2007)
Joseph Mar Thoma, Marthoma Metropolitan (2007–2020)
Theodosius Mar Thoma, Marthoma Metropolitan (2020–present)

Members Church of God International – 
Eliseo Soriano, Presiding Minister (1977–2021)
Daniel Soriano Razon, Presiding Minister (2021-present)
The Church of Jesus Christ of Latter-day Saints (complete list) –
Gordon B. Hinckley, President (1995–2008)
Thomas S. Monson, President (2008–2018)
Russell M. Nelson, President (2018–present)

Iglesia ni Cristo –
Eraño Manalo, Executive Minister (1963–2009)
Eduardo V. Manalo, Executive Minister (2009–present)

Jehovah's Witnesses, Governing Body
Lyman A. Swingle (1971-2001)
Milton G. Henschel (1971-2003)
Theodore Jaracz (1974-2010)
Karl F. Klein (1974-2001)
Albert D. Schroeder (1974-2006)
Daniel Sydlik (1974-2006)
Carey W. Barber (1977-2007)
John E. Barr (1977-2010)
Gerrit Lösch (1994-present)
Samuel F. Herd (1999-present)
M. Stephen Lett (1999-present)
Guy H. Pierce (1999-2014)
David H. Splane (1999-present)
Geoffrey W. Jackson (2005-present)
Anthony Morris III (2005-2023)
D. Mark Sanderson (2012-present)
Kenneth E. Cook Jr. (2018-present)
Gage Fleegle (2023-present)
Jeffrey Winder (2023-present)

National Council of the Churches of Christ in the USA –
Robert W. Edgar, General Secretary (1999–2007)
Michael Kinnamon, General Secretary (2007–2011)
Peg Birk, General Secretary (2012–2013)
Jim Winkler, General Secretary (2014–present)

Unification Church –
Sun Myung Moon, 'True Father' (1953–2012)
Hak Ja Han, 'True Mother'/Acting Leader (2012–present)

World Council of Churches –
Konrad Raiser, General Secretary (1993–2003)
Samuel Kobia, General Secretary (2004–2009)
Olav Fykse Tveit, General Secretary (2010–2020)
Ioan Sauca, Acting General Secretary (2020-2022)
Jerry Pillay, General Secretary (2023-present)

Hinduism
Ramanandi Sampradaya —
Rambhadracharya, Jagadguru Acharya (1988–present)
Sanatan Dharma Maha Sabha —
Krishna Maharaj (1986–2003)
Uttam Maharaj (2005–2018)
Rampersad Parasram, Dharmacharya (2019–present).

Gaudiya Vaishnavism
Gaudiya Mission —
Bhakti Suhrid Paribrajak, president-acharya (1993–2018)
Bhakti Sundar Sanyasi Maharaj, president-acharya (2018–present)
Gaudiya Vedanta Samiti —
Bhakti Vedanta Budhayan Goswami, president-acharya (2020–present)
International Society for Krishna Consciousness — the members of Governing Body Commission (Jayapataka Swami and others)
Science of Identity Foundation — Siddhaswarupananda Paramahamsa (1977–present)
Sri Caitanya Prema Samsthana — Shrivatsa Goswami, director (1972–present)
Sri Caitanya Sangha — Tripurari Swami (1985–present)
Sri Chaitanya Saraswat Math —
Bhakti Sundar Govinda Dev-Goswami, president-acharya (1988–2010)
Bhakti Nirmal Acharya, president-acharya (2010–present)
The Vaishnava Foundation — Kailasa Candra Dasa (1986–present)
World Vaisnava Association —
Srila Nayananandana Das babaji, President (1999–2002)
Srila Bhakti B. Tirtha Maharaj, President (2002–present).

Smarta tradition
Shankaracharyas —
Swami Swaroopanand Saraswati, Shankaracharya of Jyotirmath, Badrinath and Dwarka Sharada Peetham, Dwarka (1982-2022)
Swami Nischalanand Saraswati, Shankaracharya of Govardhan Math, Puri (1992-present)
Swami Bharati Tirtha Mahasannidhanam, Shankaracharya of Sringeri Sharada Peetham, Sringeri (1974–present)

Swaminarayan Sampradaya

 Ahmedabad Nar Narayan Dev Gadi  —
Acharya Shree Tejendraprasadji Maharaj (1969–2004)
Acharya Shree Koshalendraprasadji Maharaj (2004–present)
 Vadtal Laxmi Narayan Dev Gadi —
Acharya Shree Ajendraprasadji Maharaj (1984–present)
Swaminarayan Gurukul —
Guruvarya Shri Devkrushnadasji Swami (1974–present)
Acharya Shree Rakeshprasadji Maharaj (2003–present)
BAPS — 
Pramukh Swami Maharaj, President (1971–2016)
Mahant Swami Maharaj, President (2016–present)
Swaminarayan Mandir Vasna Sanstha — 
Gurudev Bapji, Founder (1987–2019)
HDH Swamishri, President (2019–present)
Gunatit Samaj — 
Pappaji Maharaj (1971–2006)
Hariprasad Swamiji Maharaj (1971–2021)
Aksharvihari Swamiji Maharaj (1971–2019)
Jashbhai Sahebji (1971–present)
Swaminarayan Gadi (Maninagar) — Jitendrapriyadasji Swami (present)

Hindu new movements
Art of Living Foundation — Sri Sri Ravishankar, Spiritual Leader, Humanitarian (1981–present)
Brahma Kumaris — Dadi Janki, Spiritual Head (1937–2020)
Isha Foundation — Sadhguru Jaggi Vasudev (1992–present)
Jagadguru Kripalu Parishat — Dr. Vishaka Tripathi, Dr. Shyama Tripathi & Dr. Krishna Tripathi, Presidents (present)
Mahanam Sampraday —
Upashak Bandhu Bhramachariji (India) (present)
Kanti Bandhu Bhramachariji (Bangladesh) (present)
Mata Amritanandamayi Math — Mata Amritanandamayi, Spiritual Leader, Humanitarian (1981–present)
Ramakrishna Mission/Vedanta Society —
Swami Ranganathananda, President (1998–2005)
Swami Gahanananda, President (2005–2007)
Swami Atmasthananda, President (2007–2017)
Swami Smaranananda, President (2017–present)
 Sri Chinmoy Centers — Sri Chinmoy (1966–2007)

Islam

Sunni

Deobandi Movement 
Taqi Usmani, Sheikh ul Islam (2004–present)

Dar al-Mustafa 
Al-Habib Umar bin Hafidz (1997–present)

Dawat-e-Islami 
Muhammad Ilyas Qadri, Founder Known as Amir of Ahlussunnah (Emir of Sunnis). Lives in Bab-ul-Madinah, Karachi (1950–present)

Muhammadiyah 
Ahmad Syafi'i Maarif (1998–2005)
Din Syamsuddin (2005–2015)
Haedar Nashir (2015–present)

Nahdlatul Ulama 
Spiritual leader
Sahal Mahfudz (1999–2014)
Mustofa Bisri (2014, temporary)
Ma'ruf Amin (2015–2018)
Miftachul Akhyar (2018–present)
Chairman
Hasyim Muzadi (1999–2010)
Said Aqil Siradj (2010–2021)
Yahya Cholil Staquf (2021–present)

Russia 
Central Spiritual Administration of the Muslims of Russia —
Talgat Tadzhuddin, Shaikh al-Islam, Grand Mufti (1980/1992–present)
Coordinating Center of North Caucasus Muslims —
Magomed Albogachiev, Chairman (1998–2003)
Ismail Berdiyev, Chairman (2003–present)
Muftiate of the Republic of Dagestan —
Ahmad Afandi Abdulaev, Mufti (1998–present)
Spiritual Administration of the Muslims of the Republic of Tatarstan —
Ğosman İsxaqi, Mufti (1998–2011)
Ildus Faiz, Mufti (2011–2013)
Kamil Samigullin, Mufti (2013–present)
Spiritual Administration of the Muslims of Russian Federation and Russian Council of Muftis —
Rawil Gaynetdin, Grand Mufti and Chairman (1996–present)

Shia

Twelver
Twelver Islam
Imams (complete list) –
Muhammad al-Mahdi, Imam (874–present) Shia belief holds that he was hidden by Allah in 874.
Marja
Mohammad-Taqi Bahjat Foumani (1993–2009)
Mohammad Fazel Lankarani (1980–2007)
Ali Khamenei (1985–)
Muhammad Saeed al-Hakim (1981–2021)
Hossein Noori-Hamedani(2000-)
Muhammad al-Fayadh (2008–)
Ali al-Sistani (1980–)
Naser Makarem Shirazi (1998–)
Hossein Waheed Khorasani (1995–)
Lotfollah Safi Golpaygani (1975–2022)

Bektashi Order –
 Baba Reshat (1991–2011)
 Baba Mondi (2011–present)

Ismaili
Dawoodi Bohras – 
Mohammed Burhanuddin, 52nd Da'i al-Mutlaq (1965–2014)
Mufaddal Saifuddin,  53rd Da'i al-Mutlaq (2014–present)

 Alawi Bohras
Haatim Zakiyuddin

Nizari Ismailism –
Aga Khan IV, 49th Imam (1957–present)

Zaidiyyah
Houthis –
Hussein Badreddin al-Houthi, leader (1994–2004)
Badreddin al-Houthi, leader (2004)
Abdul-Malik Badreddin al-Houthi, leader (2004–present)

Ahmadiyya
Ahmadiyya Community –
Khalifatul Masih IV, Mirza Tahir Ahmad (1982–2003)
Khalifatul Masih V, Mirza Masroor Ahmad (2003–present)

 Lahore Ahmadiyya Movement –
 Asghar Hameed (1996–2002)
 Abdul Karim Saeed Pasha (2003–2022)

Nation of Islam
Nation of Islam –
Louis Farrakhan, head, (1981–present)

Ibadi

 Ahmed bin Hamad al-Khalili, Grand Mufti of the Sultanate of Oman
 Haitham bin Tariq, Sultan of Oman

Judaism 
Asia
Israel, (complete list) —

Ashkenazi
Israel Meir Lau, Ashkenazi Chief Rabbi (1993–2003)
Yona Metzger, Ashkenazi Chief Rabbi (2003–2013)
David Lau, Ashkenazi Chief Rabbi (2013–present)

Sephardic
Eliyahu Bakshi-Doron, Sephardic Chief Rabbi (1993–2003)
Shlomo Amar, Sephardic Chief Rabbi (2003–2013)
Yitzhak Yosef, Sephardic Chief Rabbi (2013–present)

Military Rabbinate
Israel Weiss, Chief Rabbi (2000–2006)
Avichai Rontzki, Chief Rabbi (2006–2010)
Rafi Peretz, Chief Rabbi (2010–2016)
Eyal Karim, Chief Rabbi (2016–present)

Turkey —
David Asseo, Chief Rabbi (1961–2002)
Ishak Haleva, Chief Rabbi (2002–present)

Eurasia
Russia —
Congress of the Jewish Religious Organizations and Associations in Russia –
Adolf Shayevich, Chief Rabbi of Russia (1993–present)
Federation of Jewish Communities of Russia –
Berel Lazar, Chief Rabbi of Russia (2000–present)

Europe
Ireland —
Yaakov Pearlman, Chief Rabbi (2001–2008)
Zalman Lent, Acting Chief Rabbi (2008–present)

United Kingdom and the Commonwealth of Nations
Chief Rabbis of the United Hebrew Congregations —
Jonathan Sacks, Chief Rabbi (1991–2012)
Ephraim Mirvis, Chief Rabbi (2013–present)

North America

 Menachem Mendel Schneerson, Generational Rabbi (1902–1994)
 Joseph B. Soloveitchik, Generational Rabbi (1903–1993)
 Moshe Feinstein, Generational Rabbi (1895–1986)

Union for Reform Judaism (North America) –
Eric Yoffie, President (1996–2012)
Richard Jacobs, President (2012–present)

New religious movements

Baháʼí Faith
Baháʼí Faith, Universal House of Justice
Ali Nakhjavani (1963–2003)
Hushmand Fatheazam (1963–2003)
Ian Semple (1963v2005)
Glenford Mitchell (1982–2008)
Peter Khan (1987–2010)
Adib Taherzadeh (1988–2000)
Hooper Dunbar (1988–2010)
J. Douglas Martin (1993–2005)
Farzam Arbab (1993–2013)
Kiser Barnes (2000–2013)
Hartmut Grossman (2003–2008)
Firaydoun Javaheri (2003–2018)
Paul Lample (2005–present)
Payman Mohajer (2005–present)
Gustavo Correa (2008–2013)
Shahriar Razavi (2008–present)
Stephen Hall (2010–present)
Stephen Birkland (2010–present)
Ayman Rouhani (2013–present)
Chuungu Malitonga (2013–present)
Praveen Mallik (2018–present)
Juan Francisco Mora (2018–present)

Radha Soami
Radha Soami Satsang Beas —
Gurinder Singh, Guru (1990–present)
Radja Soami Satsang Dayalbagh —
Makund Behari Lal, Guru (1975–2002)
Prem Saran Satsangi, Guru (2002–present)
Radha Swami Satsang, Dinod —
Huzur Kanwar Saheb, Guru (present)
Ruhani Satsang —
Thakar Singh, Guru (1976–2005)

Scientology
Church of Scientology —
David Miscavige, President of Scientology; Chairman of the Board of the Religious Technology Center (1987–present)
Heber Jentzsch, President of the Church of Scientology International (1982–present)

Others
Eckankar — Harold Klemp, Mahanta (1981–present)
Elan Vital — Prem Rawat (1983–present)
Falun Gong — Li Hongzhi, Spiritual Master (1992–present)
Guanyin Famen — Ching Hai, Supreme Master (1988–present)
LaVeyan Satanism — Peter H. Gilmore, Magus (2001–present)
Movement of Spiritual Inner Awareness —
John-Roger Hinkins, Spiritual Director (1971–2014)
John K. Morton, Spiritual Director (2014–present)
Science of Spirituality — Rajinder Singh, Spiritual Master (1989–present)
Tenrikyo — Nakayama Zenji, Shinbashira (1998–present)

Other

Jainism

Śvētāmbara Terapanth —
Shri Mahapragya, Acharya (1997–2010)
Mahashraman (2010–present)

Mandaeism

Sattar Jabbar Hilo

Ravidassia
Niranjan Dass, Sant (2007–present)

Shinto

Shinto (complete list) —
Akihito, Emperor of Japan, head of Shinto (1989–2019)
Naruhito, Emperor of Japan, head of Shinto (2019–present)
Jinja Honcho —
Atsuko Ikeda, Chairperson (1988–present)

Sectarian Shinto

Konkokyo –
Heiki Konko, Spiritual Leader (1991–present)

Kurozumikyō –
Kurozumi Muneharu, Chief Patriarch (1973–2017)
Kurozumi Munemichi, Chief Patriarch (2017–present)

Unitarian Universalism

Unitarian Universalist Association –

William G. Sinkford, President (2001–2009)
Peter Morales, President (2009–2017)
Susan Frederick-Gray, President (2017–present)

See also
Religious leaders by year

Notes

References 

Lists of religious leaders by century
 List of religious leaders by year
religious leaders